Mishra Yantra is one of the four unique astronomical instruments of the Jantar Mantar observatory located in New Delhi, India. Each instrument at the Jantar Mantar are separate brilliant architectures constructed based on mathematical observations, and help in calculating different aspects of celestial objects and time. It is widely believed that the Jantar Mantar was constructed in the year 1724. The four instruments of Jantar Mantar are Samrat Yantra (a large sundial for calculating time), Jay Prakash Yantra (2 concave hemispherical structures, used to ascertain the position of Sun and other heavenly bodies), Ram Yantra (two large cylindrical structures with open top, used to measure the altitude of stars based on the latitude and the longitude on the earth) and the Mishra Yantra (meaning mixed instrument, since it is a compilation of five different instruments).

Historical and cultural importance of the Mishra Yantra 
The Mishra or composite Yantra is composed of five different instruments. This Yantra is unique to the Delhi observatory. It is believed to have been constructed by Maharaja Madho Singh (1751–68), the son of Maharaja Sawai Jai Singh II. The five component yantras are the Dakshinottar Bhitti, Samrat Yantra (a smaller version of the large sundial, attached to Mishra Yantra, in two halves), Niyat Chakra, Kark Rashivalaya, and the Western Quadrant.

The Dakshinottar Bhitti was also built in the Jaipur, Ujjain, Varanasi and Mathura observatories. It is a modified version of the Portable Meridian Dial present in Greek, Arabic, Hindu and European systems of astronomy. The Dakshinottar Bhitti of the Mishra Yantra is in the form of a graduated semicircle located on the eastern wall.

References 

Archaeoastronomy